John Sands is an Australian printing company and former distributor of games and computer hardware that is now a wholly owned subsidiary of American Greetings.

In 1851, John Sands and Thomas Kenny founded Sands and Kenny in Sydney. The firm later became Sands, Kenny & Co., and then John Sands Ltd.

American Greetings acquired John Sands from Amcor in December 1995 as part of a global expansion.

Distributor
John Sands acted as a distributor for Milton Bradley from the 1960s to the 1990s, releasing board games in Australia including Foxy, The Game of Life, Wonderland, Mix & Match, Stay Alive, Upwords and I Wish I Were. Also as a result of Hasbro acquiring MB in 1984 John Sands took on the Australian distribution of Transformers, GI Joe, with the International Heroes branding from Action Force, Jem, My Little Pony, Glo Friends until Hasbro Australia was established in the 1990s.

John Sands Electronics, based at 6 Bay Street Port Melbourne, also distributed Sega computing hardware into the Australian market, including the hardware and software of the Sega SG-1000 game console and SC-3000 computer.

John Sands was also the distributor of Corgi Toys and products of Mettoy in Australia and New Zealand.

It also has stationery products like Platignum Pens.

See also
Sands Directory

References

External links

Australian companies established in 1851
Manufacturing companies established in 1851
American Greetings
Printing companies of Australia